Jaꞑalif, Yangalif or Yañalif (Tatar: jaꞑa əlifba/yaña älifba → jaꞑalif/yañalif, Cyrillic: Яңалиф, "new alphabet") is the first Latin alphabet used during the latinisation in the Soviet Union in the 1930s for the Turkic languages. It replaced the Yaña imlâ Arabic script-based alphabet in 1928, and was replaced by the Cyrillic alphabet in 1938–1940. After their respective independence in 1991, several former Soviet states in Central Asia switched back to Latin script, with slight modifications to the original Jaꞑalif.

There are 33 letters in Jaꞑalif, nine of which are vowels. The apostrophe is used for the glottal stop (həmzə or hämzä) and is sometimes considered a letter for the purposes of alphabetic sorting. Other characters may also be used in spelling foreign names. The lowercase form of letter B is ʙ, to prevent confusion with Ь ь. Letter No. 33, similar to Zhuang Ƅ, is not currently available as a Latin character in Unicode, but it looks exactly like Cyrillic soft sign (Ь). Capital Ə also looks like Russian Э in some fonts.

History
The earliest written text in a Kipchak language, specifically the Cuman language, an ancestor of the modern Tatar language and written with Latin characters, is the Codex Cumanicus, dated 1303. Such texts were used by Catholic missionaries to the Golden Horde. Their Latin script ceased to be used after Gazaria was taken over by the Ottoman Empire in the 15th century.

For centuries the some Tatar languages as well as some other Turkic languages used a modified Arabic alphabet, İske imlâ. The deficiencies of this alphabet were both technical (abundance of positional letterforms complicated adoption of modern technology such as typewriters and teleprinters) and linguistic (Arabic language has only three vowel qualities, but Tatar has nine, which had to be mapped onto combinations and variations of the three existing vowel letters). Because of this some Turkic intelligentsia tended to use the Latin or Cyrillic script. The first attempts appeared in the mid-19th century among Azerbaijanis. At the same period the Russian missionary Nikolay Ilminsky, along with followers, invented a modified Russian alphabet for the Turkic peoples of Idel-Ural, for the purpose of Christianization; Muslim Tatars did not use his alphabet.

In 1908–1909 the Tatar poet Säğit Rämiev started to use the Latin script in his works. He used several digraphs: ea for [æ], eu for [y], eo for [ɵ] and ei for [ɤ]. Arabists turned down his project, preferring to reform İske imlâ. The simplified Arabic script, known as Yaña imlâ, was used in 1920–1927.

During the Latinisation in the Soviet Union, a special Central Committee for a New Alphabet was established in Moscow. The first project for a Tatar-Bashkir Latin alphabet was published in ئشچی (Eşce, "The Worker") newspaper on 18 July 1924. Sounds specific to the Bashkir language were written with digraphs. Following the publication, the Latin dustь ("friends of the Latin script") society was formed in Kazan on 16 November 1924. It suggested its own version of Tatar Latin alphabet, which didn't cover Bashkir sounds.

In 1926 the Congress of Turkologists in Baku recommended to switch all Turkic languages to the Latin script. In April 1926 the Jaꞑa tatar əlifʙasь / Yaña tatar älifbası / Яңа татар әлифбасы (New Tatar alphabet) society started its work at Kazan.

On July 3, 1927, Tatarstan officials declared Jaꞑalif the official script of the Tatar language, replacing the Yaña imlâ script. The first variant of Jaꞑalif did not have separate letters for K and Q (realized as K) and for G and Ğ (realized as G), V and W (realized as W). Ş (sh) looked like the Cyrillic letter Ш (she). C and Ç were realized as in Turkish and the modern Tatar Latin alphabet and later were transposed in the final version of Jaꞑalif.

In 1928 Jaꞑalif was reformed and remained in active use for 12 years. Some sources claim that this alphabet had 34 letters, but the last was a digraph Ьj, used for the corresponding Tatar diphthong. Another source states that the 34th letter was an apostrophe. They also give another sorting of the alphabet. (Ə after A, Ь after E)

After the introduction of Jaꞑalif most of the books which were printed in the Arabic alphabet were withdrawn from libraries.

Eşce (1924) alphabetical order:
 A B C Ç D Dh E F G Ĝ H I J K L M N Ꞑ O Ö P Q R S T Th U Ü W V X Y Z Ƶ Ə Э
Latin dustь (1924) alphabetical order:
 A B Ĝ Ç D E Ä Y F Gh G H I J Q K L M N Ng Ö O P R S T U Ü W X Z Ƶ Ş
Original Jaꞑalif (1927) alphabetical order:
 A B C Ç D E É Э F G H I J K L M N Ꞑ O Ó P R S T U V X Y Z Ƶ Ш W

Decline
Using two different alphabets for Russian and Turkic languages was problematic: people had to learn two different alphabets, confusing letters of one alphabet for letters from another, and Turkic languages had to use specific typewriters instead of sharing typewriters with Russian. In order to overcome these issues, a decision was made to convert Turkic languages to Cyrillic. In 1939 the Stalinist government prohibited Jaꞑalif and it remained in use until January 1940. Jaꞑalif was also used in Nazi gazettes for prisoners of war and propaganda during World War II. The alphabet served until the 1950s, because most of the schoolbooks were printed before World War II. Some Tatar diasporas also used Jaꞑalif outside of the Soviet Union, for example the Tatar bureau of Radio Free Europe.

For 12 years of usage the Latin script, Arabic script (and not only Jaña imlâ, but İske imlâ too) also were used. One of the Musa Cälil's Moabit Notebooks was written in Jaꞑalif, and another was written in Arabic letters. Both notebooks were written in German prison, after 1939, the year when the Cyrillic script was established.

Restoring Jaꞑalif

In the 1990s some wanted to restore Jaꞑalif, or Jaꞑalif+W, as being appropriate for the modern Tatar phonetics. But technical problems, such as font problems and the disuse of Uniform Turkic alphabet among other peoples, forced the use of a "Turkish-based alphabet". In 2000 such an alphabet was adopted by the Tatarstan government, but in 2002 it was abolished by the Russian Federation.

Inalif
The "Internet-style" alphabet named Inalif after Internet and älifba was convented in 2003 and partly it was inspired by Jaꞑalif. The main purpose of this alphabet was standardization of texts, which are typed on a standard English keyboard, without any diacritical marks. But this is not a simple transliteration of non-English symbols of Jaꞑalif or modern alphabet. Other changes include: ⟨ä⟩ → ⟨a'⟩; ⟨ö⟩ → ⟨o'⟩; ⟨ü⟩ → ⟨u'⟩; ⟨ç⟩ → ⟨ch⟩; ⟨ğ⟩ → ⟨gh⟩; ⟨ñ⟩ → ⟨ng⟩; ⟨ş⟩ → ⟨sh⟩. The sorting order of Inalif isn't specified, but in practice, the English sorting order is used. Inalif is used only on the Internet.

Sources

See also
Tatar alphabet
Tatar language
Uniform Turkic Alphabet

External links
 Tatar Cyrillic-Latin text and website converter

Tatar language
Latin alphabets
Alphabets used by Turkic languages
History of Tatarstan
Romanization
Writing systems introduced in 1924
1940 disestablishments in the Soviet Union
1924 establishments in the Soviet Union